George Frideric Handel (23 February 1685 – 14 April 1759) composed works including 42 operas; 25 oratorios; more than 120 cantatas, trios and duets; numerous arias; odes and serenatas; solo and trio sonatas; 18 concerti grossi; and 12 organ concertos.

Collected editions of Handel's works include the Händel-Gesellschaft (HG) and the Hallische Händel-Ausgabe (HHA), but the more recent Händel-Werke-Verzeichnis (HWV) publication is now commonly used to number his works. For example, Handel's Messiah can be referred to as: HG xlv, HHA i/17, or HWV 56. Some of Handel's music is also numbered based on initial publications, for example a 1741 publication by Walsh labelled twelve of Handel's concerti grossi as Opus 6.

Operas

Incidental music

Oratorios

Odes and masques

Cantatas

Italian duets

Italian trios

Hymns

Italian arias

English songs

German church cantatas

Italian sacred cantatas

Latin church music

Anthems

Canticles

Concertos

Concerti grossi

Orchestral works

Solo sonatas

Trio sonatas

Wind ensemble works

Keyboard works

Arrangements by/of other composers

HWV missing

Previously attributed
The following works are no longer thought to have been composed by Handel:
 The Passion nach dem Evang. Johannes (the Passion according to the evangelist John). The work was published in volume nine of the Händel-Gesellschaft (1860), but is now thought to have been composed by the German composer Georg Böhm.

See also
George Frideric Handel
Händel-Werke-Verzeichnis
Händel-Gesellschaft
Publications by Friedrich Chrysander
Hallische Händel-Ausgabe
Handel Reference Database

References

External links
Category of Handel's works at the International Music Score Library Project
List of compositions at GFHandel.org

 
Handel, George Frideric